Paul Wright (born July 29, 1969 in London, England) is a U.S. soccer forward who spent most of his career in the U.S. indoor leagues. He began his career with the San Diego Nomads in the Western Soccer Alliance, led the American Professional Soccer League in scoring in 1994 and played four seasons with the Kansas City Wizards in Major League Soccer. He currently plays for the San Diego Sockers of the Professional Arena Soccer League.

Youth
While born in England, Wright and his family moved to the United States when he was a child. They settled in Modesto California, and attended Mark Twain Junior High School where he began playing soccer in local youth leagues. At some point, his family moved to San Diego where Wright would join the powerhouse La Jolla Nomads soccer club. He also played for Grossmont High School, leading the league in scoring his junior and senior seasons. When he graduated in 1986, he held the school's single season scoring record with 39.

Professional
In 1987, Wright moved to the Nomads senior team, the San Diego Nomads which played in the Western Soccer Alliance. The Nomads won the league championship that season and again in 1988. In 1990, the WSA merged with the east-coast based American Soccer League to form the American Professional Soccer League (APSL). The Nomads spend one season in the APSL before leaving the league. In 1989, the Cleveland Crunch of the Major Indoor Soccer League drafted Wright with the sixth pick of the expansion draft.  On March 6, 1990, the Crunch traded Wright to the San Diego Sockers. The Sockers, perennial contenders, won the MISL championship that season with Wright named as the Championship Series Unsung Hero. Wright remained in San Diego until the MISL collapsed in 1992. On January 7, 1993, Wright signed with the Milwaukee Wave of the National Professional Soccer League (NSPL). Although the Wave failed to make the playoffs, Wright's forty-five goals in twenty-five games led to his selection as a first team All Star. That summer Wright signed with the Los Angeles Salsa of the outdoor American Professional Soccer League. In October, 1993, the Salsa loaned Wright to the Baltimore Blast of the NPSL. Wright was back the Salsa for the summer 1994 season, but after the Salsa folded that fall, he signed with the Wichita Wings of the NPSL for the 1994–1995 season. Wright would not return to the NPSL until 1999. In 1993, Wright signed with the Los Angeles Salsa of the outdoor American Professional Soccer League. He had not played outdoor soccer since playing with the Nomads in 1990, but this did not stop Wright from finishing second in points and goals to team mate Paulinho Criciúma, being named a first team All Star.  In 1994, Wright led the league in scoring, tying Paulhino for the points lead. He was again selected as a first team All Star.  After playing with the Baltimore Blast during the 1994–1995 winter indoor season, Wright did not return to the APSL, but instead signed with the Sacramento Knights of the Continental Indoor Soccer League (CISL). The CISL played a summer indoor schedule. In December 1995, Major League Soccer announced it had signed Wright to a league contract. In preparation for its first season, MLS signed players to contracts, then distributed these players through the league via an initial allocation and an inaugural player draft. In February 1996, the Kansas City Wizards selected Wright in the third round (twenty-fifth overall) of the 1996 MLS Supplemental Draft. He spent four seasons in Kansas City. When the Wizards released him in 1999, Wright signed with the Western Mass Pioneers where he played four outdoor seasons. In the fall of 1999, he returned to the Baltimore Blast in the NPSL. He spent most of three seasons in Baltimore, but saw time in seven games with the Philadelphia KiXX during the 2000–2001 season. In February 2002, the Blast waived Wright, who was leading the team in scoring at the time. The San Diego Sockers quickly signed Wright in preparation for the team's move to the new Major Indoor Soccer League (MISL). In October 2002, he signed another year-long contract and remained with the Sockers until it discontinued operations in December 2005. On January 5, 2005, the Chicago Storm selected Wright in the MISL Dispersal Draft. Wright both owns an athletic training company, Speed to Burn. In April 2006, he joined the San Diego Fusion of the amateur fourth division National Premier Soccer League. In 2009, he signed with the San Diego Sockers of the Professional Arena Soccer League. In May 2011, it was announced he signed with a new team in the PASL, the Anaheim Bolts. In October 2012, he re-signed with the San Diego Sockers for the 2012–13 season.

References

External links
 
 Brents, Philip Sockers Have the Wright stuff
 San Diego Sockers player bio
 MISL stats

1969 births
Living people
American Professional Soccer League players
American soccer players
Baltimore Blast (2001–2008 MISL) players
Baltimore Blast (NPSL) players
Cleveland Crunch (original MISL) players
Continental Indoor Soccer League players
English emigrants to the United States
Association football forwards
Sporting Kansas City players
Los Angeles Salsa players
Major Indoor Soccer League (1978–1992) players
Major Indoor Soccer League (2001–2008) players
Major League Soccer players
Major Soccer League players
Milwaukee Wave players
National Professional Soccer League (1984–2001) players
National Premier Soccer League players
Footballers from Greater London
Philadelphia KiXX (NPSL) players
Professional Arena Soccer League players
Sacramento Knights (CISL) players
Southern California Fusion players
Nomads Soccer Club players
San Diego Sockers (original MISL) players
San Diego Sockers (2001–2004) players
San Diego Sockers (MSL) players
San Diego Sockers (PASL) players
Soccer players from San Diego
Western Mass Pioneers players
Western Soccer Alliance players
Western Soccer League players
Wichita Wings (NPSL) players
Sporting Kansas City draft picks